Dorothy Moore (born October 13, 1946) is an American blues, gospel, and R&B singer best known for her 1976 hit song, "Misty Blue".

Career
Moore's parents were Mary Moore and Melvin Hendrex Senior. Her father performed under the stage name Melvin Henderson as a member of the Five Blind Boys of Mississippi. She was raised by her great grandmother and began singing in the church choir at a young age. She was a member of the Poppies with Petsye McCune and Rosemary Taylor when she was attending Jackson State University. The group recorded for Epic Records' Date subsidiary, reaching number 56 on the Billboard Hot 100 chart in 1966 with "Lullaby of Love". Solo singles for the Avco, GSF and Chimneyville labels followed.

Her career took off with several ballads for Malaco Records. "Misty Blue" (1976) reached number 1 on the R&B chart and number 3 on the Billboard Hot 100. "Funny How Time Slips Away" (also 1976) reached number 7 on the R&B chart and number 58 on the pop chart. "I Believe You" was number 5 on the R&B and  number 27 on the pop chart in 1977. The album of the same name was rated four and a half out of five stars retrospectively by Bil Carpenter of AllMusic.

After a hiatus, Moore recorded a gospel album, Givin' It Straight to You (1986) for the Rejoice label of Nashville. The album included a cover of "What Is This". She next recorded two albums for Volt Records. She returned to the Malaco label in 1990, for whom she recorded several albums during the ensuing decade and into the new millennium.

Moore has four Grammy Award nominations. Her version of "Misty Blue" appeared on the soundtrack for the 1996 movie Phenomenon, and on the 2005 compilation album, Classic Soul Ballads. Moore serves on the National Advisory Board of the MS Grammy Museum in Cleveland. She has been inducted into the MS Musicians Hall of Fame, Drum Major for Justice MLK Award 2008, Lifetime Achievement Award Monterey Bay Blues Festival, James Brown Heritage Jus' Blues Award 2009, the Blues Foundation Board of Directors Award 2006-2012, nominated for two Blues Music Awards 2013, Mississippi Arts Commission Achievement Award, MS Blues Trail Markers. On June 6, 2015, Moore was inducted into the Official Rhythm & Blues Music Hall of Fame in Clarksdale. Moore continues to sing live at events in and outside of the US in 2018.

Farish Street Records
Moore started the record label Farish Street Records in 2002. The label is named to honor Farish Street, the home to live and juke blues music in the neighborhood where Dorothy was raised.

Moore's albums Please Come Home For Christmas, Gittin' Down Live, I'm Doing Alright and Blues Heart were released on the label.

Discography

Albums

Singles

See also
List of soul musicians
List of disco artists (A-E)
List of people from Mississippi
List of performers on Top of the Pops

References

External links
 [ Dorothy Moore on AMG]
 [ Dorothy Moore on Billboard]
 Dorothy Moore on Soul Walking
 Farish Street Records
 An in-depth interview with Dorothy Moore at Soul Express
 An interview at Soul Express in November 2012

1946 births
20th-century American singers
21st-century American singers
Living people
American gospel singers
American contraltos
American women pop singers
American rhythm and blues singers
Musicians from Jackson, Mississippi
Jackson State University alumni
Mississippi Blues Trail
Singers from Mississippi
20th-century American women singers
21st-century American women singers
Malaco Records artists
Prelude Records artists